John Burton (6 December 1903 – 19 October 1973) was an English professional golfer. He was the older brother of Dick Burton, the winner of the 1939 Open Championship.

Burton won the 1933 Penfold-Porthcawl Tournament by two strokes from Reg Whitcombe, winning the first prize of £150. In 1946 he was runner-up in the News Chronicle Tournament, a stroke behind Norman Von Nida.

Burton won the 1949 Penfold Tournament in partnership with Max Faulkner, beating his brother Dick and Flory Van Donck in the final. Later in the year he tied with Charlie Ward in the Dunlop Masters but lost the 36-hole playoff by a single shot.

In April 1957, at the age of 53, he won the Teacher Senior Professional Championship, the first PGA Seniors Championship, winning the first prize of £250. In June he played Al Watrous for the Teachers International Senior Professional Championship, but lost 8&6 in the 36-hole match.

The Liverpool Golf Alliance play for the "John Burton Trophy". The trophy was presented to the Alliance in 1974 following his death.

Tournament wins
1933 Penfold-Porthcawl Tournament
1949 Penfold Tournament (with Max Faulkner)
1957 PGA Seniors Championship

Results in major championships

Note: Burton only played in The Open Championship.

CUT = missed the half-way cut
"T" indicates a tie for a place

Team appearances
England–Ireland Professional Match (representing England): 1933 (winners)

References

English male golfers
People from Darwen
1903 births
1973 deaths